John George Bartholomew  (22 March 1860 – 14 April 1920) was a Scottish cartographer and geographer.  As a holder of a royal warrant, he used the title "Cartographer to the King"; for this reason he was sometimes known by the epithet "the Prince of Cartography".

Bartholomew's longest lasting legacy is arguably naming the continent of Antarctica, which until his use of the term in 1890 had been largely ignored due to its lack of resources and harsh climate.

Biography
Bartholomew came from a celebrated line of map-makers. He was the son of Annie McGregor (d. 1872) and John Bartholomew Junior, and the grandson of the founder of John Bartholomew and Son Ltd. He was educated at the Royal High School, Edinburgh and the University of Edinburgh.

Under his administration the family business became one of the top operations in its field. Bartholomew himself was not merely a specialist in production, but also a talented geographer and cartographer. It was he who introduced the use of coloured contour layer maps; he also anticipated the needs of late nineteenth and early 20th century travellers by publishing street maps of major cities, cycling maps, railway timetable maps, and road maps for automobiles.

He collaborated with major scientific figures and travelers of the period on projects involving their studies. Bartholomew's Atlas of Meteorology and Atlas of Zoogeography were issues from a planned five-volume series that was never completed. Before he died he was able to plan out the first edition of the Times Survey Atlas of the World; this and its succeeding editions represent the most successful atlas project of the twentieth century. John was a great friend of geographer and writer John Francon Williams. Correspondence between the two friends is held in the Bartholomew Archive at the National Library of Scotland. Williams also acted as a literary agent for Bartholomew in America, the UK and other territories in the world.

In 1889, he married Janet MacDonald.

He handed the reins of the business on to his son John (Ian) Bartholomew (1890–1962).

A memorial to Bartholomew, sculpted by Pilkington Jackson, exists on the northern wall of the 20th century extension to Dean Cemetery in Edinburgh. His wife Jennie, sons Hugh and Ian Bartholomew, and grandson John Christopher Bartholomew are buried at the monument.

His daughter Margaret married Philip Francis Hamilton-Grierson, grandson of Sir Philip James Hamilton-Grierson.

On the centenary of Bartholomew’s death (14 April 2020), Scotland paid tribute to him, naming him the publisher who helped put ‘Edinburgh on the map’.

Chronology
1860: born in Edinburgh on 22 March
1880: begins work for his father in the family's map-making business
1884: co-founder of the Royal Scottish Geographical Society
1884–1920: honorary secretary, Royal Scottish Geographical Society
1887: elected to the Royal Society of Edinburgh
1888: succeeds his father in the family business
1888: elected to the Royal Geographical Society
1892: secretary, Section E, British Association for the Advancement of Science
1895: publishes his Survey Atlas of Scotland
1899: publishes his Atlas of Meteorology
1903: publishes his Survey Atlas of England and Wales
1905: receives the Victoria Research Gold Medal from the Royal Geographical Society
1909–1912: council member, Royal Society of Edinburgh
1910: appointed Cartographer Royal by King George V
1911: publishes his Atlas of Zoogeography
1918: receives the Helen Carver medal from the Geographical Society of Chicago
1920: dies at Sintra, Portugal, on 14 April
1922: first edition of the Times Survey Atlas of the World posthumously published

References

External links
 
 Bartholomew: A Scottish Family Heritage – site maintained by the family.
 Times World Atlases official website including a History and Heritage section detailing landmark Times atlases
 J.G. Bartholomew at Open Library
 

Fellows of the Royal Geographical Society
Fellows of the Royal Society of Edinburgh
Victoria Medal recipients
Scottish businesspeople
Scottish cartographers
Scottish geographers
Scientists from Edinburgh
1860 births
1920 deaths
People educated at the Royal High School, Edinburgh
Alumni of the University of Edinburgh
19th-century Scottish people